Alexander Semyonovich Kushner is a Russian poet from Saint Petersburg.

Biography 
Kushner was born in Leningrad into a Russian-Jewish family; his father was a naval engineer. Alexandr graduated from the Russian language and literature school of the city's teacher-training Herzen University, and later, between 1959 and 1969, taught Russian literature. After that, he became a full-time writer and poet. Since then he published about 15 collections of his poetry and two books of his essays. In 1965 he became a member of the Writers' Union, in 1987 joined the Russian PEN Center. He is also editor-in-chief of Biblioteka poeta (the "Library of the Poet" series). His only son Eugene and his family live in Israel.

In October 1993, he signed the Letter of Forty-Two.

His poetry resembles that of Acmeists. He usually doesn't write in free verse and seldom experiments or tries to elaborate a new poetic form, preferring to write in a classic, 19th century-like style. The Nobel Prize winner Brodsky once called Kushner "one of the best lyrical poets of the 20th century", adding that his name "is to stand in the line of names dear to the heart of every native Russian speaker"

Translations of Kushner's poetry into English, Italian and Dutch were published in book form; several poems were also translated to German, French, Japanese, Hebrew, Czech, and Bulgarian.

Bibliography

Books of verse 

 The First Impression 1962.
 The Night Watch 1966.
 Omens 1969.
 The Writing 1974.
 The Direct Speech 1975.
 The Voice 1978.
 Tavrichesky Garden 1984.
 Day Dreams 1986.
 The Fence Hedge 1988.
 Night Music 1991.
 On the Dark Star 1994.
 The Milfoil 1998.
 Bank of Clouds 2000.
 Bushes 2002.
 The Cold May 2005.
 In the New Century 2006.
 One Cannot Choose Times...(five decades) 2007.
 Apollo in the Grass. 2015.

Works in prose 

 Apollo under Snow
 Wave and Stone
 The Fifth Element (selected verse and articles)

Awards
His numerous awards include the Russian National Award (1996) and the prestigious Pushkin Prize for poetry, bestowed on him by Russian president Vladimir Putin in 2001. 

Also
«North Palmira» (1995).
Award of Novy Mir magazine (1997).
Tepfer fond Pushkin award (1998).
Award of Tsarskoe selo (2004).
"Poet" award (2005).

References

External links
 Short biography
 Petersburg Perspectives: Alexander Kushner has been described by Joseph Brodsky as one of the best lyric poets of the 20th century
 Времена не выбирают in verse English translation

Writers from Saint Petersburg
Russian Jews
20th-century Russian poets
Russian male poets
Living people
1936 births
Pushkin Prize winners
Herzen University alumni